Standing on a Beach (titled Staring at the Sea in CD format in some countries) is a singles compilation album released by English rock band The Cure in May 1986, marking a decade since the band's founding in 1976. The album's titles are both taken from the opening lyrics of the Cure's debut single, "Killing an Arab".

The "New Voice - New Mix" of "Boys Don't Cry" (released as a single little over a fortnight before Standing on a Beach) was not included on the album; thus the album's singles span only from 1978 to 1985.

"A Forest" on this compilation is the album version (which was also on the 12" single) but with the first 59 seconds removed. It is not the 7" single edit (which removes a few bars between verses and fades out part way through the guitar solo ending).

The album was critically acclaimed. Stephen Thomas Erlewine of AllMusic called it "one of the finest albums of the '80s".

Release formats
The album was released in six formats: vinyl record, compact disc, audio cassette, laser disc (US and Japan only), CD Video (China only) and VHD (Japan only).

The vinyl edition is a collection of all 13 of The Cure's commercially released singles up to that point in chronological order. "10:15 Saturday Night" was dropped though, possibly because it was only released in France.

The CD edition features the same tracks as the vinyl edition, but also includes an extra track from four of the band's albums. The four songs, although not released as singles, all had music videos made for them.

The cassette edition features the same tracks as the vinyl edition, but also contains all of the band's B-sides that had not, to that point, received a long-play release. This excludes "10:15 Saturday Night" from the "Killing an Arab" single, which was released on the Three Imaginary Boys album, "Plastic Passion" from the "Boys Don't Cry" single, which was released on the Boys Don't Cry album, and the five B-sides from the "Let's Go to Bed", "The Walk" and "The Love Cats" singles, which were released on the Japanese Whispers compilation album. However, the B-side "Mr. Pink Eyes" from the 12" version of "The Lovecats" was omitted from Japanese Whispers, and so was included on this release.

These releases were accompanied by a VHS and laserdisc release, a music video collection titled Staring at the Sea: The Images with the same setlist as the CD version of the album.

All the B-sides on the cassette edition were also later released on the first disc of the Join the Dots compilation in 2004.

The album has been certified 2× platinum in the US.

Also missing is the special "Lament" Flexipop single from 1982, as this was not a proper single, and "I'm a Cult Hero" from 1979, probably because it was released under a different band name (Cult Hero).

Album art
The man featured on the album cover was not a member of the Cure; he was chosen because his appearance fit the desired aesthetic of the album. His name is John Button, and was at the time a retired fisherman. He also appeared in the music video for "Killing an Arab". According to the band's 2005 biography by Jeff Apter, when asked why he agreed to lend his face to the band's media, Button's answer was, "If I can help these youngsters break through, after all, why not?" He also reportedly said that he would buy a record player and listen to one of the band's songs "out of curiosity, just to see".

Track listing

Vinyl edition

CD/video editions

Cassette edition

Side 1: Standing on the Beach - The Singles
"Killing an Arab" (Smith, Tolhurst, Dempsey) – 2:22
"Boys Don't Cry" (Smith, Tolhurst, Dempsey) – 2:35
"Jumping Someone Else's Train" (Smith, Tolhurst, Dempsey) – 2:54
"A Forest" (Smith) – 4:53
"Primary" (Smith, Tolhurst, Gallup) – 3:33
"Charlotte Sometimes" (Smith, Tolhurst, Gallup) – 4:13
"The Hanging Garden" (Smith, Tolhurst, Gallup) – 4:21
"Let's Go to Bed" (Smith, Tolhurst) – 3:33
"The Walk" (Smith, Tolhurst) – 3:28
"The Lovecats" (Smith) – 3:38
"The Caterpillar" (Smith, Tolhurst) – 3:38
"In Between Days" (Smith) – 2:56
"Close to Me" (Smith) – 3:39

Side 2: Staring at the Sea - The B-sides
"I'm Cold"  (Smith, Tolhurst, Dempsey) – 2:47 (from "Jumping Someone Else's Train")
"Another Journey By Train" (Smith, Gallup, Tolhurst, Hartley) – 3:04 (from "A Forest")
"Descent" (Smith, Gallup, Tolhurst) – 3:07 (from "Primary")
"Splintered in Her Head" (Smith, Gallup, Tolhurst) – 5:16 (from "Charlotte Sometimes")
"Mr Pink Eyes" (Smith, Tolhurst) – 2:42 (from "The Love Cats")
"Happy the Man" (Smith) – 2:45 (from "The Caterpillar")
"Throw Your Foot" (Smith) – 3:33 (from "The Caterpillar")
"The Exploding Boy" (Smith) – 2:52 (from "In Between Days")
"A Few Hours After This" (Smith) – 2:26 (from "In Between Days")
"A Man Inside My Mouth" (Smith) – 3:05 (from "Close to Me"/Half an Octopuss)
"Stop Dead" (Smith) – 4:02 (from "In Between Days"/"Close to Me"/Half an Octopuss)
"New Day" (Smith, Tolhurst) – 4:08 (from Half an Octopuss)

Comparison
Presented here is a comparison showing in what format each of the 29 songs on the album can be found, with the position number of that song on that particular format.

Charts

Weekly charts

Year-end charts

Certifications and sales

References

The Cure compilation albums
1986 compilation albums
Fiction Records compilation albums
Elektra Records compilation albums